Samtgemeinde Brome is a Samtgemeinde in the district of Gifhorn, in Lower Saxony, Germany. It is situated approximately 20 km north-east of Gifhorn and 10 km north of Wolfsburg. 16,660 citizens are living in the Samtgemeinde Brome (2020).

Structure of the Samtgemeinde Brome

References 

Samtgemeinden in Lower Saxony
Gifhorn (district)